The Australian Derby is a harness racing event held for 3 year old pacers which has been shared between many of Australia's premier tracks and is currently held annually at Launceston in Tasmania. The 2007 version was won by Lombo Pocket Watch.

The Australian Derby differs from other Derbies as it is not organised by a state controlling body but the national body.

It is in a similar vein to the Australian Pacing Championship, in that it is not a state specific event.

Harness races in Australia